Maymuna Abu Bakr (born 1948) is a Yemeni poet, songwriter and television director, the first Yemeni woman to publish a poetry collection in southern Yemen.

Life
Maymuna Abu Bakr was born in Mukalla. She holds degrees in sociology and English, and trained in television direction in Egypt.

Works
 Khuyut fi-l-shafaq [Threads in the twilight], Aden: Dar al-Tali'a.

References

1948 births
Living people
Yemeni poets
Yemeni songwriters
Television directors
Yemeni directors
Women television directors
Yemeni women writers